Morris Birdyellowhead, also known as Morris Bird, is an Indigenous Canadian actor best known for his portrayal of Flint Sky in the 2006 epic film Apocalypto, directed by Mel Gibson.

Personal life
He is a member of the Paul First Nation in Alberta. Morris now resides on his reserve raising children and working as an auto mechanic.

Filmography

References

External links

Year of birth missing (living people)
Living people
First Nations male actors
Canadian male film actors
Cree people
Male actors from Alberta
20th-century Canadian male actors
21st-century Canadian male actors